Michael Leonel Pierce (born 28 July 1993) is an Argentine professional footballer who plays as a defensive midfielder.

Career

Racing Club
Racing Club were Pierce's first senior club. He appeared on their substitutes bench under Carlos Ischia in September 2013 for a 3–0 loss to Belgrano, before making his pro debut seven months later for Reinaldo Merlo's team against Quilmes on 26 April 2014.

All Boys (loan)
In 2015, Pierce was loaned to All Boys of Primera B Nacional. Sixteen appearances in all competitions followed as they finished fourteenth.

Santamarina (loan)
January 2016 saw the midfielder join Santamarina on loan. He remained for two seasons, notably scoring his first two goals versus Brown on 25 March 2017.

Santamarina
In September, Santamarina completed the permanent signing of Pierce.

Botoșani
On 11 June 2019, Pierce joined Romania's Botoșani of Liga I. His competitive bow arrived in a 2–2 draw away to Astra Giurgiu on 13 July.

Petrolul Ploiești
On 20 January 2020, Petrolul Ploiești announced that it signed a contract with Leonel Pierce.

Career statistics
.

References

External links

1993 births
Living people
Sportspeople from Buenos Aires Province
Argentine footballers
Association football midfielders
Argentine Primera División players
Primera Nacional players
Liga I players
Liga II players
Racing Club de Avellaneda footballers
All Boys footballers
Club y Biblioteca Ramón Santamarina footballers
FC Botoșani players
FC Petrolul Ploiești players
Argentine expatriate footballers
Expatriate footballers in Romania
Argentine expatriate sportspeople in Romania